Sammy's Super T-Shirt is a British family film made by the Children's Film Foundation in 1978.

Synopsis

Pint-size Sammy Smith's (Reggie Winch) greatest ambition is to become a sporting superstar. With the aid of his West Indian friend Marvin (Lawrie Mark) and the famous Professor Hercules's body-building course, Sammy is training for the long distance running championship. Two bullies, Sammy's rivals in the race, throw his 'lucky' Tiger T-shirt through the window of a research laboratory. In trying to get it back, Sammy upsets some electrical apparatus and in the resultant explosion the T-shirt is transformed into a source of tremendous power.

The chief scientist, Mr. Trotter (Julian Holloway), and his boss, Mr. Becket (Richard Vernon), decide to exploit this discovery for their own ends, but Sammy and Marvin escape with the shirt, which enables Sammy to jump over the high factory wall, to stop the crooks car with one hand, and to run down the road like a rocket. After a number of narrow escapes, Sammy gets to the sports ground, but is tripped at the start of the race by the two bullies. With the aid of the super T-shirt, he succeeds in forging ahead, but as Marvin arrives at the ground, Sammy falters and is brought to a halt by the now volatile T-shirt. Marvin rips off the shirt and persuades Sammy to run under his own steam. Sammy eventually catches up and wins the race.

Music
The theme song, Sammy's Super T-Shirt was written by Harry Robinson and Frank Godwin. Robinson also wrote the original story from which the screenplay was adapted, and thus was credited as H. MacLeod Robertson.

References

External links
 
 

BFI Screenonline - Sammy's Super T-Shirt

1978 films
1970s English-language films
Children's Film Foundation
Films directed by Jeremy Summers
British children's films
1970s children's films
1970s British films